Drypetina, Dripetrua (died c. 66 BC) was a devoted daughter of King Mithridates VI of Pontus and his sister-wife Laodice.

Biography 
Her name is the diminutive form of the name of Drypetis, daughter of the Achaemenid king Darius III. She had a double row of teeth. According to Ammianus Marcellinus, during the Third Mithridatic War, Drypetina, severely ill, was left behind in the fortress of Sinora under the protection of the eunuch Menophilus. When the Roman forces under Mallius Priscus besieged the fortress, Menophilus killed the princess to prevent her from being captured by the Romans and then committed suicide (Amm. Marc. XVI.7.10). She appears in De Mulieribus Claris by Giovanni Boccaccio as "Dripetrua, queen of Laodicea".

Notes

References 
 

Ancient Persian people
Iranian people of Greek descent
1st-century BC Iranian people
1st-century BC women
66 BC deaths
Mithridatic Wars
Mithridatic dynasty